Táin Bó Flidhais, also known as the Mayo Táin, is a tale from the Ulster Cycle of early Irish literature. It is one of a group of works known as Táin Bó, or "cattle raid" stories, the best known of which is Táin Bó Cúailnge. Táin Bó Flidhais survives in two forms, a short version from the Old Irish period and a longer version found in the 15th century Glenmasan manuscript, which is held in the Advocates Library in Edinburgh.  It is believed to be a copy of an earlier manuscript from the 12th century.  The early version of Táin Bó Flidhais predates the Táin Bó Cúailnge. It is named for the heroine of the tale, Flidais.

Historical setting
At the time that these legendary tales relate to (the second half of the Iron Age (approximately AD 50–500) and early Medieval Ireland (approximately 500–800), Ireland was a country divided up into hundreds if not thousands of territories known as tuatha. This tale is likely to relate to incidents around 100 AD before the arrival of people bringing Christian teachings with them. Each tuath had at its head a king. Some kings were higher ranking than others and some, like Medb were the head of an entire province such as Connacht. There was constant battling amongst the kings over territorial boundaries and, as is demonstrated in this story, when one "king triumphed over another, he cut off his victim's head to parade it as a prestigious trophy, proving that he was no longer alive. Terrible things were done to the conquered king's remains by the victorious king. Brehon Laws were the order of the day and armies consisted of both men and women who fought side by side.

At the same time in Ireland, small churches were being built, some being the provenance of just a single monk (usually nowadays referred to as "saints"). The townlands where small religious communities existed are often now known by the name of the 'saint' who founded them – e.g.: Cill Ghallagáin (Church of St. Galligan) or Cill Chomáin.  Some of these small churches grew into religious communities of monks which got larger and more prosperous; others remained small and fairly insignificant. This period was the Golden Age of making illuminated manuscripts and craftworking of relics with gold and silver filigree in the monasteries. Some items, like the Cross of Cong or the Ardagh Chalice can be seen in Irish museums today.

The Early Christian and the tuatha communities existed side by side across the Irish landscape, sometimes in harmony, sometimes not. Often the kings of the tuatha found it advantageous to become patrons of their local religious community as it gave them prestige. The people of the tuatha were usually the extended family of the king. They would have included many generations of relatives and also children of other tuatha who were given “fosterage” by a different tuatha and treated with as much love as if they were the children of the king. This extended family was the army with which the territorial battles were fought between kings.

Táin Bó Flidhais is not as well known as the Táin Bó Cuailnge, but the story it relates is equally as complex and intricate. It includes many of the most important characters of Irish saga literature who appear in many of the cycles of legends from the period. Queen Maedbh, the Queen of Connacht, is one such individual, as are Cú Chulainn and the irresistible hero, Fergus mac Róich.

The story of the Táin Bó Flidhais is set in the province of Connacht in Ireland in the late Iron Age . The royal fort of Cruachan, near Tulsk in Roscommon was the seat of the Queen of Connacht, Maedbh and her husband, King Ailill MacMáta.

Glenmasan manuscript
The most notable addition provided by the Glenmasan manuscript to the Táin Bó Flidhais is the precursor story of the death of the sons of Uisnech. Conchobar mac Nessa sends Fergus mac Róich to bring the sons of Uisnech back from exile in Scotland so that they might help Conchobar 'defend the province of Ulster against every other province in Ireland.' Dierdre has an ill-omened dream that her husband Naisi, son of Uisnech, will be betrayed. Fergus insists he will let no harm come to them. Naisi trusts Fergus and the sons of Uisnech return to Ireland. They arrive at Borrach's fortress, where Fergus is immediately put under a Geas. ‘I have a feast for you, Fergus,’ said Borrach, ‘and it is a tabu of yours to leave a feast until it is ended.’ ‘You have done ill, Borrach,’ said Fergus, ‘to put me under prohibitions, seeing that Conchobar made me pledge my word to bring the sons of Uisnech to Emain on the day that they should come to Ireland.’ ‘I put you under prohibitions,’ said Borrach, ‘prohibitions that true heroes suffer you not to escape unless you come to consume that feast.’

Fergus was forced to remain with Borrach, and so sent his two sons on to Emain Macha with Naisi and Dierdre. Dierdre has another dream in which she sees all of her companions without their heads. She advises them ‘To go to Dundalk where Cú Chulainn is, and remain there until Fergus comes, or go to Emain under Cú Chulainn's safeguard.’ Otherwise, 'treachery and ruin will be wrought upon you.’ Again her advice is ignored.

Naisi receives a warning from his childhood friend Levarcham. ‘It is not well for you, dear children,’ said she, ‘to have with you that (viz. Deirdre) which he (Conchobar) felt hardest to be taken from him, now that you are in his power. And it is to visit you that I have been sent,’ said Levarcham, ‘and to see whether her own form and figure remain to Deirdre. And sad to me is the deed that will be done this night in Emain, namely, treachery and guile and breach of faith to be wrought upon you, beloved friends.'

When Conchobar receives word from another warrior that Diedre is indeed still beautiful, Conchobar fights the sons of Uisnech to win back Deirdre. The sons of Fergus take up arms against their king for the honor of their father who pledged to keep Naisin and Dierdre safe. Fergus's son Illann is killed. Fergus forsakes Ulster and defects to Cruachan. From here, the tale continues in a similar manner as the older Irish version, as follows.

Main story
The Táin Bó Flidhais tells the tale of a punitive raid by them on one of the Gamhanraidh tribe who lived in County Mayo, a tribe as well respected in Connacht as the Red Branch Knights were in Ulster. The heroine of the tale is Flidhais Fholtchain ("Flidhais of the lovely soft hair"), a ravishing beauty, a Celtic Artemis, who was married to Oilill Fionn, a king of the Gamhanraidh tribe and the son of a powerful chieftain called Domhnall Dualbhuidhe ("Donal of the yellow locks") who lived at Glencastle in Erris and operated the gates to the Mullet Peninsula. Flidhais and Oilill owned two forts in Co. Mayo, one at Rathmorgan, known as Dún Flidhais, situated at the southern end of Carrowmore Lake in Erris, and another west of Lough Conn near Nephin, known as Dún Átha Féan, further south. The Gamhanraidh tribe, of which Flidhais and Oilill were part, owned large stretches of territory, stretching all the way west of the Shannon from North Mayo as far down as County Clare.

Flidhais and Oilill had a legendary white cow, the Maol, which, it was reputed, gave vast quantities of milk every day – said to be enough milk to satisfy three hundred men together with their women and their children in one milking. They also owned several other enormous herds of cattle and deer. Flidhais and Oilill had four daughters, one of whom was said to be the adulterous lover of the hero Cú Chulainn. Flidhais had a reputation of having a voracious sexual appetite herself and she harboured a lust for the Ulster hero Fergus mac Róich who, having fought with and killed so many tribal chieftains in Ulster, was lying low at Cruachan, the royal rath of Maedbh and Ailill in Roscommon, for his own safety. Fergus had gone to Cruachan after his triumphant bloody battles in Ulster, to gain the shield of the name and fame of Queen Maedbh and her consort, King Ailill mac Máta.

Fergus was a fine figure of a man and it did not take long for the "shameless" Queen Maedbh to fall hopelessly in lust with her equally promiscuous guest. Her consort Ailill, however, observed the daily infidelity and one night, in retaliation, he stole Fergus's enchanted sword from his guest's scabbard and replaced it with a wooden replica.

Treachery of Bricne
There were always many 'guests' from various tribal factions at Cruachan for one reason or another.  At the same time as Fergus was a guest there, there was another guest by the name of Bricne Nimhtheanga of whom it was said "he rejoiced in iniquity as much as in satire". It was he who initiated the battle which became known as the Táin Bó Flidhais.

Flidhais had her precious 'Maol' penned at her fort of Dún Flidhais at Rathmorgan in Erris. She often lived at this fort in Erris while her husband stayed at the fort on Lough Conn.  They had large herds of cattle at both places and this suggests they were very wealthy as ownership of cattle was the main indicator of power and wealth prevailing in the economy at the time.

Bricne Nimhtheanga decided to set off for Dún Flidhais fort in Erris. His plan was to cause trouble. Travellers associated with the Queen of Connacht were treated with great courtesy everywhere they went so when Bricne arrived at Rathmorgan he was courteously welcomed, wined and dined by Flidhais and her entourage who all turned out in their best finery for the occasion. Flidhais had the fort heavily perfumed and decorated with mistletoe and herbs and they wined and dined in great style.

Later everyone was tired and went to sleep apart from Flidhais and Bricne. He sang to Flidhais:
From Cruachan we have come
To Erris in the west of Elga.
In every Dún we passed, we heard
Of Flidhais and her cow,
Flidhais the lady of Oilill,
Dear to me the name of the spouse,
Domhnall Dualbhuidhe's warrior son,
Bounteous the lady who will not forsake me
When we came out of Eamhain
Our quarrel left no slight track
The cause of Fergus whose exploits are many
Brought us in numbers to Cruachain

Flidhais asked Bricne to describe Fergus mac Róich to her. He played up to Flidhais knowing that she had a great knowledge of and interest in Fergus from tales from a long time past when Fergus had been a king in Ulster. Bricne related to Flidhais all the charms of Fergus while also telling her that he never met a better man than Oilill, Flidhais's husband.

The next morning Bricne left Dún Flidhais and set off on the return journey to Cruachan. When he got back, he told Queen Maedbh that Flidhais's fort in Rathmorgan was the most magnificent palace he had ever visited. Fergus heard this and he lusted for Flidhais, making Maedbh a jealous woman. Bricne encouraged disquiet amongst everybody to make as much trouble as possible.

Fergus's lust for Flidhais
Fergus decided he had to meet with Flidhais, this magnificent woman with a reputed sexual prowess to match his own, and he quickly set off to travel to the fort where he would find Flidhais. Oilill heard about Fergus lusting for his wife and he set out from his fort to meet Fergus's entourage. When the two entourages met there was a heated argument. Oilill Fionn bluntly asked Fergus "are you coming here to take my wife?" Fergus admitted that that was his intention.

Battles
They challenged each other to a combat to sort out the matter. First the two chiefs met in hand-to-hand combat, then their supporters joined in the battle. Blood flowed and over 1,000 men were killed.  Fergus drew out his magic sword, but it was only the wooden replica placed there by Ailill, the consort of Queen Maedbh, and his sword failed to give him the special powers Fergus expected it to. Oilill's troops emerged triumphant.  Fergus was captured by the Gamhanraidh and kept at the cells in Dún Flidhais fort, his remaining troops returned to the royal rath at Cruachan, filthy and exhausted.

Back at Cruachan, troops were mustered and Queen Maedbh, angry at the thought of losing her young lover to Flidhais, mustered an army consisting of her tribe and all its supporters and family.  Maedbh's army set out on the predatory incursion to Erris which became known as the Táin Bó Flidhais. They approached from the south defeating all the tribes who challenged them along the way and leaving a trail of blood in their wake. Queen Maedbh's daughter, Red Cainner, was killed by a spear when Maedbh herself ducked to avoid being struck, and this gave her great sadness and remorse. Her lamentation:

Dig ye the grave of Cainner lying here on the mound, slain
Fermenn, son of Dara Dearg, threw the spear, which caused her death.
Red Cainner, daughter of Ailill and Maedbh.
She is the victim at the mound of the shade.
The darling of the warriors of Enian.
The spouse of Lughaid Mac Conroc.
During seven short days of delight and valour.
Raise her pillar above her grave stone.
Dig ye her grave

After the burial the army continued on their way and eventually reached Carrowmore Lake and the fort at Rathmorgan.

Oilill and Flidhais were both there at the fort waiting for the arrival of Queen Maedbh's army.  Fergus MacRoigh was being held as a prisoner and had been trussed up and put on display in sight of the exasperated lovelorn Queen Maedbh.

Oilill found himself surrounded by the troops of Queen Maedbh and called on all his support of the Gamhanraidh tribes to defy the oncoming army.

Treachery

Dressed in regal splendour and presenting a magnificent sight, Queen Maedbh offered the leaders of Oilill's army the kingship of the Gamhanraidh and permanent quarters at her royal rath at Cruachan if they fought on her side.  To a man, they accepted her bribes and deserted Oilill's army.

Single handed combat followed between the troops of Queen Maedbh and the Gamhanraidh. Despite their losses, the Erris warriors won most of the combats and Maedbh was devastated once again when three of her closest fosterlings lost their lives.

Oilill and his entire household, except for Flidhais, went up the ramparts of the fortress at Rathmorgan to monitor the situation below, leaving Fergus and the other prisoners alone with Flidhais in the fort.  During this time Fergus and Flidhais hatched a treacherous plot so that they could be together.  When Oilill returned, Flidhais gave him a strong drink and she continued to ply him with drink until he was well and truly intoxicated.  When he was lying unconscious, Flidhais sent a message to Maedbh's troops to launch an attack on the fort.  Oilill was unable to defend the fort and the prisoners inside the fort were released.

Once Fergus had his freedom, he was determined to get his own back on Oilill for his ill-treatment while he had been held prisoner.  A bloody battle ensued and eventually Oilill and his remaining troops retreated behind the walls of the Rathmorgan fort.  His Gamhanriadh army now numbered only 97 individuals.

The treachery of Chiortán from Dún Chiortáin
As morning dawned, the troops mustered again and the Gamhanriadh decided to make a break for Trá Chinn Chiortain, close to Inver on the east shore of Broadhaven Bay, in Kilcommon.  The chieftain of the peninsula, Ciortán, from Dún Chiortáin in Glengad, assured Oilill that he would have his swiftest ship ready and waiting to take them safely out to sea away from the Cruachan invaders.

When Queen Maedbh's troops discovered the fort at Dún Flidhais deserted, they pursued their prey up the shores of Carrowmore Lake into Inver and Ciortán's waiting boat.  However, when Chiortain saw them coming he pulled his boat out of the harbour, leaving Oilill stranded on the shoreline.  Oilill had forgotten that Chiortain still held a grudge against him for seducing his wife some time previously.  Despite the pleas of Oilill for Chiortan to help him, Chiortan refused to come back into the shore and took his boat out further into Broadhaven Bay, The furious Oilill placed a large rock into his slingshot and fired it at Chiortain's boat.  The deadly aim struck Chiortain in the neck and such was the force that his head was severed from his body and the boat, Chiortain and his crew sunk to the bottom of Broadhaven Bay.  The bay between Barnatra and Inver is known as Trá Chiortáin to this day.  The Queen's army caught Oilill at Log na Fola, (the bloody hollow) leading to the following “rann”:
May you have wet arses
Munster scum, evil rogues,
Without benefit of sun,
Or bee or flower,
In a lonely hollow,
Without cerements in misery,
May the hordes of hell follow you
Round and round forever and forever

Oilill died like a prince it was reported.  His head was cut off by a triumphant Fergus and was impaled on a lance and brought back to the fort at Rathmorgan to prove to Flidhais that she was now a free woman.  Fergus presented her husband's severed head as a courtship present to Flidhais.  However, Flidhais was overcome with guilt as she looked in Oilill's unblinking all-knowing eyes and she was horrified at what had happened to her husband.  She burst into tears and demanded his body be brought back to their fort. The troops retrieved Oilill's body and when Flidhais looked at his body, gashed all over and covered in blood, she was again filled with such remorse she began to recount his every worthy action during his lifetime.  Tradition maintains that Oilill is buried just north of Inver in a tumulus which is marked on today's maps as a 'mound'.

Maedbh's army then set about wreaking havoc on the Rathmorgan fort in retaliation for the death of several of Maedbh's children. When the fort was reduced to ruins, the army set off eastwards back to Cruachan.  Domhnall, in his fort at Glencastle was devastated to hear of the death of his son.  Fergus carried off both Flidhais and her Maol cow and anything else that was of value from Dún Flidhais fort and also her great herds of cattle and deer.

Maol
Fergus tried to get the 'Maol' cow to rise and walk but she refused to get up.  His men believed that the Maol was in grief and sorrow due to the death of her Master.  Fergus lost his temper then and prodded the Maol with his sword.  When she still refused to get up, he beat her nine rhythmic blows across her back.  She bellowed and lowed so loudly that her agonies could be heard for many miles around.  Still the cow did not get up on her feet.  Bricne came then and said that he could make the 'Maol' get up if he got enough gifts and payment in return for that favour.  Fergus agreed to that and the Maol rose to her feet and led the captured herds away from Erris on the long journey towards Cruachan.

Attack of the wolfhounds

Queen Maedbdh's army had set off in the same direction towards Barrooskey but to their surprise they met opposition from small bands of the Gamhanraidh tribes who popped out of every crevice along the way, attacking the retreating troops trying to return to Cruachan.  There were so many of these attacks that while the army was still in the Glenamoy hills, the melee turned into a full-scale battle again.  The indomitable Gamhanraidh made a grotesque pile of Irish warrior heads on the ground.  At this stage, Domhnall from Glencastle arrived on the scene again with a new army which consisted of vicious wolfhounds.  Their handlers released the dogs and they tore into Maedbh's army, tearing the soldiers limb from limb. Then Fergus came in face-to-face combat with Domhnall Duabhuidhe and he died at Glenamoy by the sword of Fergus.  More troops to support the Gamhanraidh were coming to the scene from Croagh Patrick.  After the death of his grandfather, Muireadhach, known as Muireadhach the Stutterer, became the leader of the Gamhanraidh and continued the attack on Maedbdh's troops until he recovered Flidhais and her Maol.  Some versions relate that Muireadhach later married Flidhais, others that she lived out the rest of her life in obscurity.

Despite being faced with dangers along the entire route of their journey, the battle-weary Maedbh along with Ailill and Fergus finally made it back to Cruachan and that was the end of the tale of the Táin Bó Flidhais.

The Mayo Táin
The tale of Táin Bó Flidhais is also known as 'The Mayo Táin' and there are several local versions with minor differences in the story.

In local versions, Flidhais is known as Munhin and Domhnall Dualbhuidhe from Dún Domhnall fort in Glencastle takes the place of Oilill Fionn, being Flidhais's lover, rather than her lover's father.  In one of the most common versions, the fort of Dún Domhnall in Glencastle is taken by a surprise attack and the forts of Dún Chiortain and Dún Chaochain, the two main promontories in Kilcommon parish, also fall to the raiders.  Munhin watching the ensuing battles from a distance is most impressed by the leader of the invading army, none other than Fergus.  She requested that a truce be called and Domhnall invited his enemy, Fergus, to enjoy the hospitalities of his fort, Dún Domhnall at Glencastle. It is alleged that Fergus was such a magnificent manly specimen that no woman could look on him without desiring him.  In comparison with her husband, whose body was scarred with battle scars, the young Fergus was like a God who women found irresistible.  Munhin found the young stud an exciting bedmate and he found that she was like nine women to him.  Domhnall had an enchanted sword which gave him his strength and which he carried everywhere with him.  An enchantress had the secret to the sword.   Munhin's lust for Fergus grew by the day and his for her.  One night they appealed to the enchantress by the use of a magic spell.  The enchantress saw the passion they had for one another and she imparted the secret of wresting the sword away from Domhnall.  At this, a thunderclap shook the glen and Munhin was afraid for what she had done.

A few days later, Fergus said he was leaving the Dún at Glencastle and himself and Domhnall drank a lot of liquor.  Domhnall fell asleep he drank so much.  Munhin cut his sword off using the secret magic from the enchantress.  Fergus took the sword and with one fell swoop he cut off Domhnall's head.  The next morning, Fergus's flag flew over Dún Domhnall's fort.  Fergus and Munhin then lived together as man and wife.  One day Fergus received a call to return to the fort at Cruachan in the middle of Ireland.  Munhin insisted on going on the trip with him.  They set off on a black steed in torrential rain.  They reached the small river which joins the Owenmore River leading from Carrowmore Lake which was in flood and they had to ford the river across one small stick.  As they crossed the river, Fergus, fearing that Munhin would be as faithless to him as she had been to her former husband, gave her a push and she fell into the flooded waters.  She flailed wildly but failed to be able to save herself and she was drowned.  The river has ever since been known as the Munhin River.  Following the murderous attack, Fergus continued on his way but at Barrooskey (a remote townland near Glenamoy in the east of Kilcommon parish in the Barony of Erris).

See also
Brian Rua U'Cearbhain
Táin Bó

External links
 Táin Bó Flidhais (audio)—excerpt read by author and historian Stephen Dunford.
 The Glenmasan Manuscript - Donald McKinnon (1904–1907), Translation of the Táin Bó Flidais from Scots Gaelic into English. Celtic Review, Volumes 1(1), 1(2) 1(3), 2(4), 2(5), 2(6), 2(7), 2(8), 3(9), 3(10), 3(11), 3(12) 4(13), 4(14), 4(15)
 English translation of the Glenmasan Manuscript

References

Kings of Connacht
Ulster Cycle
Royal sites of Ireland
Narratives of the Ulster Cycle
Medieval literature
Early Irish literature
Irish texts
Irish-language literature